Events from the year 2010 in Taiwan, Republic of China. This year is numbered Minguo 99 according to the official Republic of China calendar.

Incumbents 
 President – Ma Ying-jeou
 Vice President – Vincent Siew
 Premier – Wu Den-yih
 Vice Premier – Eric Chu, Sean Chen

Events

January
 7 January – The United States approves a US$6 billion arms sales package to Taiwan, amid opposition from Mainland China.
 9 January – Opposition Democratic Progressive Party wins all three seats in by-elections against the ruling Kuomintang.

March
 4 March – The 6.3  Kaohsiung earthquake affected the southern part of the island with a maximum Mercalli intensity of VI (Strong), injuring 96 people.
 14 March – 314 Taipei protest in Taipei.
 22 March – The commissioning of Zhushan Power Plant in Nangan Township, Lienchiang County.

April
 3 April – The opening of Penghu Living Museum in Magong City, Penghu County.

May
 1 May
 Taiwan employs capital punishment for the first time since 2005, executing four men for "grave offences such as fatal kidnappings and murders".
 The opening of Kaohsiung Museum of Labor in Kaohsiung City.
 7 May – The establishment of Cross-Strait Tourism Exchange Association in Daan District, Taipei City.
 15 May – Year of the Rain is shown on TV.
 28 May – Murder of Weng Chi-nan in Taichung.

June
 1 June – The establishment of Academia Sinica Institute of Astronomy and Astrophysics.
 26 June – Anti-ECFA protest.

July
 3 July – The restoration of the annual Yilan International Children's Folklore and Folkgame Festival in Yilan County.
 7 July – Protests in Hong Kong and Taiwan mark the 73rd anniversary of the Marco Polo Bridge Incident.

August
 1 August – The upgrade of Transworld Institute of Technology in Douliu City, Yunlin County to TransWorld University.
 19 August – The Legislative Yuan passed an amendment to the Act Governing Preferential Treatment for Retired Presidents and Vice Presidents.

September
 14 September – Typhoon Fanapi.

October
 10 October – The establishment of Republic of China Presidential Museum in Zhongzheng District, Taipei.
 16 October – The opening of Lanyang Museum in Toucheng Township, Yilan County.

November
 3 November – The opening of Luzhou Line and Xinzhuang Line of Taipei Metro.
 6 November – The establishment of Taipei Expo Park in Zhongshan District, Taipei City.
 26 November – Sean Lien shooting incident in Yonghe District, Taipei County.
 27 November – 2010 Republic of China municipal election.

December
 2 December – Discussion of Chiang Kai-shek diary (兩蔣日記) research continues.
 20–22 December – Sixth Chen-Chiang summit at Grand Hotel in Zhongshan District, Taipei City.
 25 December
 The upgrade of Taipei County to New Taipei City with all of its cities and townships becoming districts.
 The upgrade of Taichung City from provincial city to special municipality with Taichung County.
 The upgrade of Tainan City from provincial city to special municipality with Tainan County.
 The merger of Kaohsiung City with Kaohsiung County to form a larger Kaohsiung City municipality.
 31 December – The appointment of Chang Chia-juch as the Chairman of China Airlines.

Deaths
 24 February – Ang It-hong, 82, Taiwanese singer-songwriter and actor, pancreatic cancer.
 4 July – Hwang Yau-tai, 98, Taiwanese musician and composer. multiple organ failure.
 20 July – Lin Tsung-yi, 89, Taiwanese psychiatrist.
 19 November – Lin Tsung-nan, 68, Taiwanese politician, Magistrate of Nantou County (2001–2005), adenocarcinoma of the lung.
 2 December – Lee Huan, 93, Taiwanese politician, Premier of the Republic of China (1989–1990).

References 

 
Years of the 21st century in Taiwan
Republic of China